Bernard Rancillac was a French painter and sculptor. He was one of the pioneers of Narrative Figuration.

Early life and career
Rancillac was born on August 29, 1931 in Paris. He spent his childhood in Algeria and he returned with his family to France in 1937. In 1949, under family pressure, he tried to become teacher of drawing at the workshop of Met de Penninghen, where he met Bernard Aubertin. During his military service in Morocco, he first exhibited his drawings in a library of Meknes. In 1961, he received the prize for painting at the Biennial of Paris. In 1962, he became a pioneer of French Narrative Figuration.

Solo exhibitions (Selection) 

 2017: Rancillac, les années pop, Museum of the Holy Cross Abbey, Les Sables-d'Olonne, Fr
 2017: Rancillac, Rétrospective, Headquarters of the French Communist Party, Paris, Fr
 2014: Encore lui, vie et mort de Mickey, Galerie Lelia Mordoch, Paris, Fr
 2003: Rétrospective, Musée d'art moderne (Saint-Étienne), Fr
 2001: Morceaux choisis, Galerie Sonia Zannettacci, Geneva, Switzerland
 1998: Jazz, Fort Napoléon, La Seyne-sur-Mer, Fr
 1997: Jazz, galerie Hervé Lourdel, Paris, Fr
 1995: Cinécollages, Galerie Convergence, Paris, Fr
 1994: Orient-Occident, Meymac Abbey, Meymac, Fr
 1992:  Sud-Sud, Galerie Vincent, Réunion, Fr
 1991: 1931-61-91, Galerie Thierry Salvador, Paris, Fr
 1989: Cinémonde, Galerie 1900-2000, Paris, Fr
 1988: 25 ans d'images provocantes, Galerie Michel Vidal, Paris, Fr
 1987: RANCILLAC., Galerie Convergence, Paris, Fr
 1985: 20 ans de peinture, French Institute of Greece, Athens, Greece
 1980: À la mémoire de…, Musée d'Art Moderne de Paris, Paris, Fr
 1974: Jazz, Galerie Mathias Fels, Paris, Fr
 1969:  Pornographie, Galerie Daniel Templon, Paris, Fr

References 

1931 births
2021 deaths
Lycée Lakanal alumni
Academic staff of Pantheon-Sorbonne University
20th-century French painters
21st-century French painters
Painters from Paris